Seksit Srisai (born August 29, 1992) is a Thai professional footballer who plays as a central midfielder.

Honours

Club
Muangthong United
 Thai League 1 (1): 2016
 Thai League Cup (1): 2016

External links
 

1994 births
Living people
Seksit Srisai
Seksit Srisai
Association football midfielders
Seksit Srisai
Seksit Srisai
Seksit Srisai
Seksit Srisai
Seksit Srisai
Seksit Srisai
Seksit Srisai
Seksit Srisai
Seksit Srisai